Kolin is an unincorporated community in Rapides Parish, Louisiana United States and is part of the Alexandria metropolitan area, Louisiana. Along with the nearby town of Libuse, it was founded in 1914 by Czech immigrants, and named after Kolín, Czech Republic.

Geography

References

External links 
 History of Kolin, Louisiana Czech Museum

Unincorporated communities in Rapides Parish, Louisiana
Unincorporated communities in Louisiana
Alexandria metropolitan area, Louisiana
Czech-American culture in Louisiana
Populated places established in 1914
Czech communities in the United States